TS-121 (THY1773) is an orally active, selective vasopressin V1B receptor antagonist which is under development by Taisho Pharmaceutical for the adjunctive treatment of major depressive disorder. As of May 2017, it is in phase II clinical trials for this indication.

See also
 ABT-436
 Balovaptan
 List of investigational antidepressants
 Nelivaptan
 SRX-246

References

External links
 

Antidepressants
Drugs with undisclosed chemical structures
Experimental drugs
Vasopressin receptor antagonists